Moeaki Fotuaika (born 16 November 1999) is a Tonga international rugby league footballer who plays as  for the Gold Coast Titans in the NRL.

He has previously played at representative level for Queensland in the State of Origin series.

Background
Born in Gisborne, New Zealand, Fotuaika moved to Brisbane with his family in 2007 at age 7. 

He played his junior rugby league for the Greenbank Raiders and attended Keebra Park State High School before being signed by the Gold Coast Titans.

Playing career

Early career
In 2015, Fotuaika played for the Souths Logan Magpies in the Cyril Connell Cup. 

In 2016, he moved up to the club's Mal Meninga Cup side. 

In 2017, Fotuaika joined the Gold Coast Titans, playing for their under-20s side, winning the club's Under-20 Player of the Year award. On 6 May 2017, Fotuaika represented the Junior Kiwis against the Junior Kangaroos.

2018
On 11 January, Fotuaika re-signed with the Titans until the end of the 2021 season, joining the club's NRL squad. He began the season playing for the Tweed Heads Seagulls in the Queensland Cup.

In Round 9 of the 2018 NRL season, he made his NRL debut in the Titans' 18–32 loss to the Canberra Raiders. He played 16 games in his rookie season for the club, scoring two tries. On 19 September, he was selected in the Tonga 29-man squad for their Test match against Australia, but did not play.

2019

On 27 August, Fotuaika extended his contract with the Titans for one season, until the end of 2022. He played 21 games for the Titans before his season was cut short due to knee and wrist injuries.

On 13 September, Fotuaika won the Paul Broughton Medal for Titans' Player of the Year, becoming the youngest winner of the award.

2020
On 7 October, Fotuaika was named in Queensland's 27-man squad for the 2020 State of Origin series, Fotuaika would debut in Origin 2 of the series off the bench in the 34–10 loss, however Queensland would end up winning the series 2–1.

2021
He played 22 games for the Gold Coast in the 2021 NRL season including the club's elimination final loss against the Sydney Roosters.

2022
Fotuaika played a total of 23 games for the Gold Coast in the 2022 NRL season as the club finished 13th on the table.

In October 2022 he was named in the Tonga squad for the 2021 Rugby League World Cup.

Personal life
Fotuaika's older brother Mosese, who was a member of the Wests Tigers NRL squad, committed suicide in 2013. Another older brother, Feao, plays for the Queensland Reds in Super Rugby.

References

External links
Gold Coast Titans profile

1999 births
Living people
New Zealand rugby league players
New Zealand sportspeople of Tongan descent
Gold Coast Titans players
Queensland Rugby League State of Origin players
Rugby league players from Gisborne, New Zealand
Rugby league props
Tonga national rugby league team players
Tweed Heads Seagulls players